The Really Big Family is a 1966 American documentary film directed by Alexander Grasshoff about the Dukes family of Seattle, who had 18 children. It was nominated for an Academy Award for Best Documentary Feature.

See also
List of American films of 1966

References

External links

The Really Big Family at David L. Wolper Productions

1966 films
1966 documentary films
1966 short films
American short documentary films
American black-and-white films
1960s English-language films
Black-and-white documentary films
1960s short documentary films
Films directed by Alex Grasshoff
Films set in Seattle
Documentary films about families
1960s American films